Podosphaera fusca is a fungus that parasitically infects plants (a phytopathogen). It is one cause of powdery mildew in melons and gourds.

Some sources suggest that P. fusca should be considered synonymous with P. xanthii, while others maintain they are separate species in the subsection Magnicellulata of the section Sphaerotheca of the genus Podosphaera, based on the size of chasmothecia, and on the thin-walled portion of the asci (oculus).

References

External links

Fungal fruit diseases
Fungal plant pathogens and diseases
fusca
Vegetable diseases
Fungi described in 1829
Taxa named by Elias Magnus Fries